Priit Sibul (born 31 December 1977 in Valga) is an Estonian politician, member of the Riigikogu, and Secretary General of Pro Patria and Res Publica Union.

References

1977 births
21st-century Estonian politicians
Isamaa politicians
Living people
Members of the Riigikogu, 2011–2015
Members of the Riigikogu, 2015–2019
Members of the Riigikogu, 2019–2023
Members of the Riigikogu, 2023–2027
People from Valga, Estonia